Galineh may refer to:
 Galineh-ye Bozorg
 Galineh-ye Kuchak